Nephrosperma vanhoutteanum is a species of palm tree, and the only species in the genus Nephrosperma. It is found only in Seychelles, where it is threatened by habitat loss.

References

Verschaffeltiinae
Trees of Seychelles
Near threatened plants
Monotypic Arecaceae genera
Endemic flora of Seychelles
Taxonomy articles created by Polbot
Taxa named by Isaac Bayley Balfour
Taxobox binomials not recognized by IUCN